The October to December 1590 papal conclave (8 October – 5 December) was the second conclave of 1590, and the one during which Gregory XIV was elected as the successor of Urban VII. This conclave was marked by unprecedented royal interference from Philip II of Spain.

The pontificate of Urban VII 
Urban VII was elected as pope on 15 September 1590. On 27 September 1590 he died due to malaria infection after only 12 days of his pontificate before he could be crowned, giving him the shortest papacy in history. His death was deeply mourned by the poor from Rome who inherited his wealth.

Participants 
The conclave after the death of Urban VII was attended by all the cardinals who took part in his election, with the exception of Cardinal Federico Cornaro (who had died on 4 October). 
Protodeacon Andreas von Österreich and Camerlengo Enrico Caetani also came to Rome. Of the 65 total cardinals, 54 took part in conclave.:

 Giovanni Antonio Serbelloni (nominated on 31 January 1560) –Cardinal- Bishop of Ostia and Velletri; Dean of the Sacred College of the Cardinals; prefect of the Congregation of Ceremonies 
 Alfonso Gesualdo (26 February 1561) –Cardinal- Bishop of Porto and S. Rufina; Subdean of the Sacred College of Cardinals, prefect of the Sacred Congregation of Rites
 Innico d'Avalos d'Aragona, O.S.Iacobis. (26 February 1561) –Cardinal- Bishop of Frascati
 Marco Antonio Colonna, (12 March 1565) – Cardinal- Bishop of Palestrina; legate of Campagna and Marittima; archpriest of St. John Lateran's Basilica
 Tolomeo Gallio (12 March 1565) – Cardinal-Bishop of Sabina
 Gabriele Paleotti (12 March 1565) – Cardinal- Bishop Albano; archbishop of Bologna
 Markus Sitticus von Hohenems (26 February 1561) – Cardinal- Priest of S. Maria in Trastevere; Protopriest of the Sacred College of Cardinals 
 Michele Bonelli, O.P. (6 March 1566) – Cardinal- Priest of S. Lorenzo in Lucina; Vicar General for the Vatican City State; vice rector of Sabaudia; Grand prior in Rome of the Sovereign Order of Malta
 Ludovico Madruzzo (26 February 1561) – Cardinal- Priest of S. Anastasia; Bishop of Trento; Cardinal- protector of Germany
 Giulio Antonio Santori (17 May 1570) – Cardinal- Priest of S. Bartolomeo all’Isola; Grand Inquisitor of the Supreme Sacred Congregation for the Roman and Universal Inquisition and the French Congregation; Archbishop of S. Severina
 Girolamo Rusticucci (17 May 1570) – Cardinal- Priest of S. Susanna; vicar general of the diocese of Rome; Camerlengo of the Sacred College of Cardinals
 Nicolas de Pellevé (17 May 1570) – Cardinal- Priest of S. Prassede; prefect of the Sacred Consistorial Congregation; Archbishop of Sens
 Gian Girolamo Albani (17 May 1570) – Cardinal- Priest of S. Giovanni a Porta Latina; governor of the Bagnoreggio
 Girolamo Simoncelli (22 December 1553) – Cardinal- Priest of S.  Prisca; administrator of Orvieto
 Pedro de Deza (21 February 1578) – Cardinal- Priest of S. Girolamo degli Schiavoni
 Antonio Carafa (24 March 1568) – Cardinal- Priest of S. Giovanni e Paolo; Prefect of the Tribunal of the Apostolic Signature; Prefect of the S.C. of the Tridentine Council; Librarian of the Holy Roman Church
 Giovan Antonio Facchinetti (12 December 1583) – Cardinal- Priest of SS. IV Coronati
 Alessandro Ottaviano de' Medici (12 December 1583) – Cardinal- Priest of S. Ciriaco alla Terme; Archbishop of Florence
 Giulio Canani (12 December 1583) – Cardinal- Priest of S Eusebio; Bishop of Adria
 Niccolò Sfondrati (12 December 1583) – Cardinal- Priest of S. Cecilia; Bishop of Cremona
 Antonmaria Salviati (12 December 1583) – Cardinal- Priest of S. Maria della Pace
 Agostino Valier (12 December 1583) – Cardinal- Priest of S. Marco; Bishop of Verona
 Vincenzo Lauro (12 December 1583) – Cardinal- Priest of S. Clemente; Bishop of Mondovi
 Filippo Spinola (12 December 1583) – Cardinal- Priest of S. Sabina; Prefect of the Congregation for Propagation of the Faith; legate in Umbria, Perugia and Spoleto
 Simeone Tagliavia d'Aragona (12 December 1583) – Cardinal- Priest of S. Maria degli Angeli
 Scipione Lancelotti (12 December 1583) – Cardinal- Priest of S. Salvatore in Lauro; The secretary for Latin letters
 Giovanni Vincenzo Gonzaga, O.S.Io.Hieros. (21 February 1578) – Cardinal- Priest of S. Alessio
 Enrico Caetani (18 December 1585) – Cardinal- Priest of S. Pudenziana; Camerlengo of the Holy Roman Church; Latin Patriarch of Alexandria
 Giovanni Battista Castrucci (18 December 1585) – Cardinal- Priest of S. Maria in Aracoeli; Archbishop of Chieti; Prefect of the Supreme Tribunal of the Apostolic Signatura
 Domenico Pinelli (18 December 1585) – Cardinal- Priest of S. Lorenzo in Panisperna; Archpriest of St. John Lateran's Basilica; legate of papal galleys
 Ippolito Aldobrandini (18 December 1585) – Cardinal- Priest of The Papal Basilica of St Pancrazio Outside the Walls; Apostolic Penitentiary
 Girolamo della Rovere (16 November 1586) – Cardinal- Priest of S. Pietro in Vincoli; Archbishop of Turin
 Girolamo Bernerio, O.P. (16 November 1586) – Cardinal- Priest of S. Maria sopra Minerva; Bishop of Ascoli-Piceno
 Antonio Maria Gallio (16 November 1586) – Cardinal- Priest of S. Agnese in Agone; Bishop of Perugia; legate in Romania
 Costanzo Buttafoco da Sarnano, O.F.M.Conv. (16 November 1586) – Cardinal- Priest of S. Pietro in Montorio
 Ippolito de Rossi (18 December 1585) – Cardinal- Priest of S. Biagio dell’Anello; Bishop of Pavia
 William Allen (7 August 1587) – Cardinal- Priest of S. Silvestro a Martino ai Monti
 Scipione Gonzaga (18 December 1587) – Cardinal- Priest of S. Maria del Popolo; Latin Patriarch of Jerusalem
 Antonio Maria Sauli (18 December 1587) – Cardinal- Priest of SS. Vitale, Gervasio e Protasio; Archbishop of Genoa
 Giovanni Evangelista Pallotta (18 December 1587) – Cardinal- Priest of S. Mateo in Merulana; Archbishop of Cosenza; the Archpriest of the Vatican Basilica and prefect of Fabric of Saint Peter
 Juan Hurtado de Mendoza (18 December 1587) – Cardinal- Priest of S. Maria Transpontina; cardinal protector of Spain
 Giovan Francesco Morosini (15 July 1588) – Cardinal- Priest of S. Maria in Via; Bishop of Brescia
 Mariano Pierbenedetti (20 December 1589) – Cardinal- Priest of SS. Marcellino e Pietro; Bishop of Martorano
 Gregorio Petrocchini, O.E.S.A. (20 December 1589) – Cardinal- Priest of S. Agostino
 Andreas von Austria  (19 November 1576) – Cardinal Deacon of S. Maria Nuova; Protodeacon of Sacred College of Cardinals; Bishop of Constance; Bishop-Coadjutor of Brixen; cardinal protector of Austria
 Francesco Sforza di Santa Fiora (12 December 1583) – Cardinal Deacon of S. Maria in Via Lata
 Alessandro Peretti de Montalto (13 May 1585) – Cardinal Deacon of S. Lorenzo in Damaso; Vice-Chancellors of the Holy Roman Church; legate in Bologna; cardinal protector of Poland
 Girolamo Matei (16 November 1586) – Cardinal Deacon of S. Eustachio; pro-prefect of the Sacred congregation of the Council of Trent
 Benedetto Giustiniani (16 November 1586) – Cardinal Deacon of S. Maria in Cosmedin
 Ascanio Colonna (16 November 1586) – Cardinal Deacon of S. Nicola in Carcere Tulliano
 Federico Borromeo (18 December 1587) – Cardinal Deacon of S. Agata in Suburra
 Francesco Maria Bourbon del Monte (14 December 1588) – Cardinal Deacon of S. Maria in Domnica
 Agostino Cusani (14 December 1588) – Cardinal Deacon of S. Adriano
 Guido Pepoli (20 December 1589) – Cardinal Deacon of San Cosma e Damiano

Twenty-four electors were nominees of Sixtus V, fifteen of Gregory XIII, six of Pius V, eight of Pius IV, and one of Julius III.

Absentees 
Eleven cardinals were absent:
 Gaspar de Quiroga y Vila (15 December 1578) – Cardinal- Priest of S. Balbina; Archbishop of Toledo and Primate of Spain; Inquisitor General of the Spanish Inquisition
 Albrecht VII Habsburg (3 March 1577) – Cardinal- Priest of S. Croce in Gerusalemme; Inquisitor General of the Portuguese Inquisition ; Viceroy of Portugal
 Rodrigo de Castro Osorio (12 December 1583) – Cardinal- Priest of SS. XII Apostoli; Archbishop of Seville
 Charles II de Bourbon-Vendôme (12 December 1583) – Cardinal- Priest Archbishop of Rouen, administrator of Diocese of Bayeux
 François de Joyeuse (12 December 1583) – Cardinal- Priest of SS. Trinita al Monte Pincio; Archbishop of Toulouse ; cardinal protector of France
 Jerzy Radziwiłł (12 December 1583) – Cardinal- Priest of S. Sisto; Bishop of Vilnius
 Philippe de Lenoncourt (16 November 1586) – Cardinal- Priest of S. Onofrio; prefect of The Congregation of the Index
 Pierre de Gondi (18 December 1587) – Cardinal- Priest of S. Silvestro in Capite; Bishop of Paris
 Andrew Báthory (4 July 1584) – Cardinal Deacon of S. Angelo in Pescheria; Bishop of Warmia; Bishop-coadjutor of Kraków 
 Hugues Loubenx de Verdalle, O.S.Io.Hieros. (18 December 1587) – Cardinal Deacon of Santa Maria in Portico,; prefect of papal galleys; Grand prior in Rome of the Sovereign Order of Malta
 Charles de Lorraine (20 December 1589) – Cardinal Deacon ; Bishop of Metz

Seven of them were appointed by Gregory XIII and four by Sixtus V.

Divisions and candidates 
As during the previous conclave there were three large factions:
Spanish faction – political supporters of Spain. The core of the party was formed by Cardinals Madruzzo (faction leader), Deza, Mendoza, Tagliavia d'Aragona, Spinola, Marchntonio Colonna, Ascanio Colonna, Gallio, Pellevé, Santori, Rusticucci, Sfondrati, Paleotti, Simoncelli, Facchinetti, Carafa, Allen, Cusani, Giovanni Vincenzo Gonzaga, Scipione Gonzaga, Andreas von Österreich and Caetani;
Sistine faction – nominees of Sixtus V who were led by his grandnephew Alessandro Peretti de Montalto. The members of this faction were Cardinals Castrucci, Pinelli, Aldobrandini, della Rovere, Bernerio, Galli, Sarnano, Rossi, Sauli, Pallotta, Morosini, Pierbenedetti, Petrocchini, Matei, Giustiniani, Borromeo, del Monte and Pepoli;
Gregorians – nominees of Gregory XIII: Sforza, Medici, Canani, Salviati, Valeri, Lauro, Lancelotti. Cardinal Sforza, the leader of this faction, was related by marriage to Gregory XIII.

There were two small groups practising nepotism. One was related to Pius IV (Sitticus von Hohenems, Serbelloni, Gesualdo i Avalos d'Aragona) and the other to Pius V (Bonelli, Albani). Due to the small size of the groups they almost did not play any major role and the majority of nominees of these Popes became part of the Spanish faction.

The Cardinals who were considered as papabile were Serbelloni, Marchntonio Colonna, Gallio, Paleotto, Madruzzo, Santori, Facchinetti, Sfondrati, Valier, Lauro, della Rovere.

In the context of this conclave, the Prophecy of the Popes was forged, probably in order to support Cardinal Girolamo Simoncelli's bid for the papacy.

Interference from Philip II of Spain 
On 6 October, even before the conclave had started, the Spanish ambassador Olivares gave the Cardinals the official recommendations of King Philip II. They contained two lists of names.  The first one had seven names: Madruzzo, Santori, Facchinetti, Sfondrati, Paleotti, Gallio and Marcantonio Colonna. The king’s official will was a choice of one of those seven names. The second list contained the names of 30 cardinals, who Philip II put a clear veto on. The subjects from Madrid were banned from voting against the king’s recommendations. Philip II wished to secure his claim to the French throne by gaining power over The Holy See. Although in the past, secular monarchs had many times and in different ways tried to influence the election of popes, such an explicit interference was unprecedented.  It was the beginning of what in the seventeenth century was considered as Jus exclusivae.

Conclave 
The conclave began on 8 October, with 52 cardinals. A few days later, Camerlengo Caetani joined them after his return from France, and on 13 October Cardinal Andreas von Österreich arrived.
Cardinal Mantalto nominated Ippolito Aldobrandini but Cardinal Madruzzo, who was the leader of the Spanish faction, and according to the will of King Philip II, effectively torpedoed this candidacy. The nomination of Cardinal Vincenzo Lauro, which was proposed by Montalo and Sforza, suffered the same fate.

On 12 October, a rumor broke in Rome that Marco Antonio Colonna was elected the new Pope. His nomination did take place but did not receive the majority of votes, due to the opposition of Sforza and his faction. The Spanish did not want to support him either. Although Colonna was one of Philip II's choices, unofficially it was known that both he and Gallio were not popular in Madrid and their election was unlikely.

On 15 October, the Spanish faction took the initiative and nominated its leader Madruzzo. The candidacy met with strong opposition from the Sforza, d'Aragony and the Venetian cardinals. Objections against Madruzzo included his close ties with the king of Spain, his poor state of health (he was impaired by gout), and even his origin (his mother was German).

After the rejection of Madruzzo, Cardinal Montalto offered the Spanish faction five names — Aldobrandini, Lauro, Valiero, Salviati and Medici — and asked them to pick one. As King Philip had rejected all five of them, none of them were chosen.

As a result of the prolonged sede vacante, more and more chaos reigned on the streets. During November, disagreements among the Cardinals increased instead of decreasing. The main opponent of the Spanish faction was Cardinal Montalto.

At the end of November, the majority of cardinals gradually came to the conclusion that no matter how outrageous the interference of Philip II, without the support of his followers there was no chance to elect a Pope, so it would be better to choose someone from his list. On 4 December, therefore, supported by the Madrid faction, Cardinal Paleotti received 33 votes (he needed another three to win). Montalto did not prefer Paleotti, so together with Sforza he came to the conclusion that in order to prevent his election, they needed to support either Sfondrati or Facchinetti. In the end, they decided to elect Sfondrati.

Election of Gregory XIV 
On the morning of 5 December 1590, after nearly two months' conclave, 55-year-old Cardinal Niccolo Sfondrati, Bishop of Cremona, was elected Pope, and chose the name Gregory XIV. His coronation took place on 8 December 1590.

Notes

Sources 

Von Pastor, Lugwig (1932). "History of the Popes", V. 22. London
Chacón, Alfonso (1677).  "Vitæ, et res gestæ Pontificvm Romanorum et P R. E. Cardinalivm ab initio nascentis Ecclesiæ vsque ad Vrbanvm VIII. Pont. Max,"  V. IV. Rome (Latin)
Eubel, Konrad (1922) "Hierarchia Catholica."  V. IV. Padwa (Latin)

External links 
 Sede Vacante 1590
 

1590 in the Papal States
16th-century elections
1590 in politics
1590 in Europe
1590 10
16th-century Catholicism